Charlevoix Airport  is located  south southwest of La Malbaie, in the Charlevoix-Est Regional County Municipality of Quebec, Canada.

References

External links
Official site
Page about this airport on COPA's Places to Fly airport directory

Registered aerodromes in Capitale-Nationale